Ivo Lah (5 September 1896 – 23 March  1979) was a Slovenian mathematician and actuary, best known for his discovery of the Lah numbers in 1955 and for the Lah identity. In the 1930s, Lah made the first tables about mortality rates in Slovenia.

Biography
Ivo Lah was born in Štrukljeva Vas near Cerknica, Austria-Hungary on 5 September 1896.

In the 1930s, Lah made the first tables about mortality rates in Slovenia. Lah published Racunske osnovice zivotnog osiguranja in 1947.

Lah died at Ljubljana, Yugoslavia (which is in present-day Republic of Slovenia).

References

1896 births
1979 deaths
Actuaries
20th-century Slovenian mathematicians
Yugoslav mathematicians
Faculty of Science, University of Zagreb alumni
University of Vienna alumni
Slovenian military personnel
Austro-Hungarian Army officers
Austro-Hungarian military personnel of World War I
Academic staff of the University of Zagreb
Academic staff of the Sapienza University of Rome
People from the Municipality of Cerknica